Francofonte (Sicilian: Francufonti) is a comune (municipality) in the Province of Syracuse, Sicily, southern Italy, located about  southeast of Palermo and about  northwest of Syracuse.

Francofonte borders the following municipalities: Buccheri, Carlentini, Lentini, Militello in Val di Catania, Scordia, Vizzini.

The Patron Saint of the town is the Madonna della Neve on August the 5th. The largest church is the chiesa madre Sant'Antonio Abate.

References

External links
 Official website

Municipalities of the Province of Syracuse